The 1990 Mexican Grand Prix was a Formula One motor race held at Autodromo Hermanos Rodriguez on 24 June 1990. It was sixth race of the 1990 Formula One World Championship, the 14th Mexican Grand Prix and the fifth since the Mexico City circuit returned to the Formula One calendar in 1986. It was held over 69 laps of the 4.4 kilometre circuit for a race distance of 305 kilometres.

The race was won by reigning world champion, French driver Alain Prost driving a Ferrari 641. Prost, the 1988 race winner, became the second multiple-winner in Mexican Grand Prix history, joining British driver Jim Clark who won the race in 1962 (non-championship), 1963 and 1967. It was Prost's second win of the year after the Brazilian Grand Prix. Prost won the race by 26 seconds over his British teammate Nigel Mansell. Third was Austrian driver Gerhard Berger driving a McLaren MP4/5B. Ayrton Senna stopped with a puncture late in the race, allowing both Prost and Berger to close to eight points behind him in the Driver's Championship.

Qualifying

Pre-qualifying report
During the Friday morning pre-qualifying session, Olivier Grouillard was fastest for the first time this season, in the Osella. The Larrousse-Lolas of Éric Bernard and Aguri Suzuki were second and fourth, with the EuroBrun of Roberto Moreno between them in third place.

For the third Grand Prix in succession, the AGS cars missed out in fifth and sixth positions, with Yannick Dalmas faster than Gabriele Tarquini this time. AGS technical director Hugues de Chaunac left the team prior to this event, frustrated at the team's lack of progress. Seventh again was Bertrand Gachot in the Coloni, although he was much closer to the pace on this occasion, just three tenths of a second behind Tarquini. Claudio Langes was a distant eighth again after only completing the minimum three laps required by the regulations, as the team concentrated on Moreno. Bottom of the time sheets as usual was Bruno Giacomelli in the Life, only managing an out-lap before his engine failed. Team manager Sergio Barbasio confirmed that his engineers were working on converting the L190 chassis to run with the Judd CV engines he now claimed to have bought from Lotus.

Pre-qualifying classification

Qualifying report
There were no driver changes as the F1 show moved to Mexico City. The weather was changeable during the weekend, catching some drivers out, with both of the Larrousse team's drivers having major accidents on the Saturday morning. Despite that, both Aguri Suzuki and Éric Bernard managed to qualify for the race. The Leyton House drivers Ivan Capelli and Maurício Gugelmin both failed to qualify.  At the front of the grid, Gerhard Berger took pole from Riccardo Patrese, Ayrton Senna, Nigel Mansell, Thierry Boutsen, Jean Alesi, Pierluigi Martini, Nelson Piquet, Satoru Nakajima, and Stefano Modena, with championship contender Alain Prost, not happy with the qualifying set up of his Ferrari so deciding instead to qualify with his race set up, 13th. Roberto Moreno was disqualified for receiving a push start in qualifying.

Qualifying classification

Race

Race report
Sunshine greeted the drivers on race day and at the start it was Patrese who got away from Senna, Berger, Boutsen, and Piquet. Senna and Berger both passed Patrese on lap 2, and the McLaren drivers opened a significant lead over the rest of the field. Prost was charging through the field from his poor grid position, while Piquet moved up to third. Berger's run in second place came to an early end when he had to stop for new tyres on lap 13, leaving Piquet in second but under pressure from his former team-mate Nigel Mansell, who was able to pass him soon afterwards. Prost continued his charge through the field, eventually taking second from Mansell with 15 laps to go. Prost proceeded to set off after Senna, who was beginning to slow with tyre problems. The Brazilian had gambled on tyre durability by not making a stop for fresh rubber. On lap 60, Prost got past Senna with a simple move and three laps later Senna's rear tyre exploded, forcing him to retire from his 100th Grand Prix. As he had completed over 90% of the race, he was classified as a finisher in 20th place, the lowest classified result of his career. The battle for second place between Mansell and Berger culminated in Mansell passing around the outside of Berger going into the ultra-fast Peraltada corner. Mansell thus finished second behind Prost, with Berger third from Alessandro Nannini, Boutsen, and Piquet.

Race classification

Championship standings after the race

Drivers' Championship standings

Constructors' Championship standings

 Note: Only the top five positions are included for both sets of standings.

References

Mexican Grand Prix
Mexican Grand Prix
Grand Prix
June 1990 sports events in Mexico